The Wycliffe Christian School (abbreviated as WCS) is an independent non-denominational Christian co-educational early learning, primary and secondary day school, located in Warrimoo, in the Blue Mountains region of New South Wales, Australia.

History 
The Wycliffe Christian School started in 1976 as a small school of 28 students based in a church hall in Warrimoo. It then also made use of a church hall in Mt Riverview until 1979 when the whole school moved into the Warrimoo campus in Rickard Road. It was originally called John Wycliffe Christian School, named after John Wycliffe, the man who translated the bible from Latin to English in 1382. Since moving to the Warrimoo location, the school has had six major renovations, the last of which being the construction of a multi million dollar Administration Office in 2013. 
Under the first principal, Geoff Wheaton, the school grew steadily. Robert Johnston replaced Geoff Wheaton as principal in 1978 and the school continued to grow. Geoff Bowser replaced Robert Johnston in 2005. Geoff Bowser was replaced in 2015 by Peter Jamieson. Two interim principals in 2017 were George Granville, then Kathy Pereira. The current principal, David Johnston, began in 2018. In 2008 Wycliffe opened their 'transition' class which provides Christian pre-kindergarten daycare services.

Principals 
The following individuals have served as Principal of the Wycliffe Christian School:

Notable alumni 
The following individuals are notable alumni of the Wycliffe Christian School:

 Tim Dormer – winner of Big Brother (Australian season 10)
 Heidi Lenffer – of alternative rock band Cloud Control
 Ulrich Lenffer – of alternative rock band Cloud Control
 Jeremy Kelshaw – of alternative rock band Cloud Control

See also

 List of non-government schools in New South Wales

References

Private primary schools in New South Wales
Private secondary schools in New South Wales
Nondenominational Christian schools in New South Wales
Educational institutions established in 1976
1976 establishments in Australia
Education in the Blue Mountains (New South Wales)

(* Michele Campfens is one of the graduating year 10 students prior to accreditation for year 11 & 12 was one of the original year 10 graduating class of 1980 “1980-2020 A reminder for the Ancients” by Michele Campfens copies of which are gifted to the school. She also collated photos and stories (along with her husband/ teacher at Groves) of the students of Groves Christian College, Kingston Qld into a book to funds for those students affected by the 2011 floods.  A copy gifted to Prince William and Princess Katherine on their visit)